The 2000 World Mountain Running Championships was the 16th edition of the global mountain running competition, World Mountain Running Championships, organised by the World Mountain Running Association.

Results

Men Senior 
Individual

Team

Women Senior 
Individual

Team

Medal table (junior events included)

References

External links
 

World Mountain Running Championships
World Long Distance Mountain Running